Aporometridae is a monotypic family of crinoids, the only genus being Aporometra, which contains three species, all endemic to the seas around Australia.

Description 
Members of this family have five arms which subdivide near the base giving them ten arms in total. The arms can reach  in length and at the base of the calyx there are up to 25 cirri, often longer than the arms. Unique among Comatulida, the cirri are flattened on the underside. The gonads are located on the pinnules and not on the arms, and the embryos are brooded in cavities in the arms.

Species 
The World Register of Marine Species lists the following species in this genus:

 Aporometra occidentalis HL Clark, 1938
 Aporometra paedophora (HL Clark, 1909)
 Aporometra wilsoni (Bell, 1888)

References 

 
Comatulida
Echinoderm families
Taxa named by Hubert Lyman Clark
Animals described in 1938